WBZG 100.9 FM is a radio station licensed to Peru, Illinois, covering, LaSalle, Peru, Princeton, and Vicinity. WBZG airs a classic rock format and is owned by Mendota Broadcasting, Inc.

History

WGSY
The station began broadcasting on March 15, 1970, holding the call sign WGSY. The station was originally owned by George W. Yazell, and had an ERP of 3,000 watts at a HAAT of 145 feet. WGSY aired a variety format. In 1977, the station was sold to Radio Illinois, Ltd. for $85,000.

WIVQ
In 1977, the station's call sign was changed to WIVQ, and the station began airing a MOR format. By 1980, the station had begun airing an adult rock format. By 1983, the station had begun airing a beautiful music/easy listening format. By 1984, the station was airing a MOR format. In 1984, the station was sold to Starved Rock Radio Project for $155,000.

WLRZ
In September 1984, the station's call sign was changed to WLRZ. WLRZ would air an adult contemporary format. By 1990, the station had begun airing a classic rock format. In 1994, the station was sold to Valley Plus Broadcasting for $150,000. In 1997, the station was sold to Mendota Broadcasting, Inc., along with 103.3 WAIV, for $700,000.

WBZG
In July 2000, the station's call sign was changed to WBZG, and the station was branded "The Buzz". However, in August 2000, 107.7 WBZM in Bloomington would begin broadcasting with "The Buzz" branding, airing a modern rock format. Unbeknownst to WBZG, the owner of WBZM had trademarked "The Buzz" branding for the entire state of Illinois, and WBZG stopped calling itself "The Buzz" to avoid a lawsuit. The station would later be branded "100.9 FM Rocks!".

On January 24, 2023, it was announced that Studstill Media had sold WBZG, along with its sister stations, to Shaw Media in Crystal Lake, Illinois, for a total of $1.8 million. The sale is presently under FCC review with anticipation of being completed later in the year.

References

External links
WBZG's website

BZG
Classic rock radio stations in the United States
Radio stations established in 1970
1970 establishments in Illinois